The 1980 Stanley Cup Finals was the championship series of the National Hockey League's (NHL) 1979–80 season, and the culmination of the 1980 Stanley Cup playoffs. It was contested by the New York Islanders in their first-ever Finals appearance and the Philadelphia Flyers, in their fourth Finals appearance, and first since 1976. The Islanders would win the best-of-seven series, four games to two, to win their first Stanley Cup championship and the third for a post-1967 expansion team after Philadelphia's Cup wins in 1974 and 1975.

Paths to the Finals

New York defeated the Los Angeles Kings 3–1, the Boston Bruins 4–1 and the Buffalo Sabres 4–2 to advance to the Final.

Philadelphia defeated the Edmonton Oilers 3–0, the New York Rangers 4–1 and the Minnesota North Stars 4–1 to make it to the Final.

Game summaries
In game one, Denis Potvin scored the first power-play overtime goal in Stanley Cup Final history. In game six, Bob Nystrom scored the Cup winner in overtime, his fourth career overtime goal, at the time putting him alone behind Maurice Richard's six on the all-time overtime goal-scoring list. Ken Morrow joined the team after winning the Olympic gold medal and added the Stanley Cup to cap a remarkable season.

The deciding game six was marred by one of the most infamous blown official calls in NHL playoff history.  With the game tied 1–1, the Islanders Butch Goring picked up a drop pass from New York left wing Clark Gillies which had clearly gone back over the Flyers' defensive zone blue line into center ice. Linesman Leon Stickle waved the play as on-side, and Goring threaded a pass to right wing Duane Sutter who beat Philadelphia goalie Pete Peeters for a 2-1 New York lead. The Flyers argued vehemently to no avail. Everyone on both sides except Goring and Sutter appeared to relax as if play had been blown dead once the puck went over the blue line. Flyers captain Mel Bridgman stated the play changed the momentum of the game at a critical time even though the Flyers scored shortly afterwards to tie the score 2-2.  Stickle admitted after the game that he had blown the call. Ultimately, it was the Flyers lack of discipline and the resulting Islander Power Play goals that were the difference in the series. 

The series-winning overtime goal in game six was scored by Bobby Nystrom and assisted by fellow third liners John Tonelli and Lorne Henning.  Nystrom's redirection of Tonelli's cross-ice pass from just above the Flyers left side face-off circle, floated up and over goalie Pete Peeters' blocker before the Philadelphia keeper could slide over to stop the puck.  Henning's "thread the needle" pass was a key component, of the goal.

Team rosters

New York Islanders

|}

Philadelphia Flyers

|}

Stanley Cup engraving
The 1980 Stanley Cup was presented to Islanders captain Denis Potvin by NHL President John Ziegler following the Islanders 5–4 win over the Flyers in game six.

The following Islanders players and staff had their names engraved on the Stanley Cup

1979–80 New York Islanders

Broadcasting
Bob Cole, Dan Kelly and Jim Robson shared play-by-play duties for CBC's coverage. Cole did play-by-play for the first half of Games 1 and 2. Meanwhile, Kelly did play-by-play for the rest of Games 1–4 (Kelly also called the overtime period of Game 1). Finally, Robson did play-by-play for first half of Games 3–4 and Game 6 entirely. In essence, this meant that Cole or Robson did play-by-play for the first period and the first half of the second period. Therefore, at the closest stoppage of play near the 10-minute mark of the second period, Cole or Robson handed off the call to Kelly for the rest of the game. However, the roles of Kelly and Robson switched for Game 5.

In the United States, the first five games were syndicated by the Hughes Television Network.  Hughes used CBC's Hockey Night in Canada feeds for the American coverage. Game 6 was televised in the United States by the CBS network, as a special edition of its CBS Sports Spectacular anthology series. Dan Kelly did the play-by-play for CBS for the first and third periods as well as overtime.  Tim Ryan did play-by-play for the second period while Lou Nanne served as the color commentator throughout. Game 6 remains the last Stanley Cup Final game to be played in the afternoon (earlier than 5 p.m. local time). This would also be the last NHL game to air on U.S. network television until NBC televised the 1990 All-Star Game, and the last time entire Finals series was broadcast on U.S. network television until ABC's coverage of the 2022 Stanley Cup Finals.

See also
 1980 NBA Finals
 1980 World Series
 Super Bowl XV

References

Notes

1979–80 NHL season
Stanley Cup Finals
New York Islanders games
Philadelphia Flyers games
May 1980 sports events in the United States
Ice hockey competitions in New York (state)
Ice hockey competitions in Philadelphia
1980 in sports in New York (state)
1980 in sports in Pennsylvania
1980s in Philadelphia
Finals